Cyrtinus jamaicensis is a species of beetle in the family Cerambycidae. It was described by Howden in 1970. It is known from Jamaica, from which its species epithet is derived.

References

Cyrtinini
Beetles described in 1970